In Japanese folklore, the , literally translating to "child of hammer", is a snake-like being.

According to legend, some tsuchinoko have the ability to speak and a propensity for lying, and they are also said to have a taste for alcohol. Legend records that it will sometimes swallow its own tail so that it can roll like a wheel, similarly to the "hoop snake" of American legend.

See also
 List of cryptids

References

 A model of the tsuchinoko by Hajime Emoto (English introduction)

Yōkai
Legendary serpents